Miss Earth 2012, the 12th edition of the Miss Earth pageant, was held on November 24, 2012 at the Versailles Palace in Las Piñas, Philippines. Olga Álava of Ecuador crowned her successor Tereza Fajksová of the Czech Republic at the end of the event.

The pageant was broadcast live internationally on Star World and was shown 25 November 2012 at 10:00 a.m. on ABS-CBN, with coverage on Studio 23, TFC-The Filipino Channel, and also on channels of participating counties worldwide. Miss Earth-Air went to Stephany Stefanowitz, a 23-year-old German-Filipino fashion designer and model from Quezon City, Philippines. Miss Earth-Water went to Osmariel Villalobos, a 24-year-old broadcaster from Maracaibo, Venezuela. Miss Earth-Fire went to Camila Brant, a 22-year-old student and model from Minas Gerais, Brazil. 80 contestants competed for the crown in this year's edition.

The theme of this year's Miss Earth edition was "International Year of Sustainable Energy for All".

Results

 Miss Earth
 Miss Earth – Air
 Miss Earth – Water
 Miss Earth – Fire
 Top 8
 Top 16

Placements

Major Special Awards

Minor Special Awards

Special awards

Challenge Events

M.E. Trivia Challenge
The "Miss Earth 2012 Trivia Challenge" was held on 4 November 2012.

Walk with M.E.
The "Walk with Miss Earth Campaign" were held on the following dates:  4, 6, 7 and 8 November 2012.

Liter of Light Project Campaign
The "Liter of Light Project Campaign" were held on the following dates:  6, 8 and 10 November 2012 in San Juan. The project promotes the use of plastic bottles with water as an alternative bulb. The following candidates are hailed as "The Fastest Learners" in making the project.

Environmental Seminar
The Environmental Seminar of the Miss Earth 2012 candidates was held on 7 November 2012 at the Bulwagang Ninoy, Ninoy Aquino Parks and Wildlife in Diliman, Quezon City. The following candidates were chosen with the "Best Participation":

In the same event, the following candidates were chosen as the "Most Sociable":

M.E. Greenbag Challenge
The Miss Earth Greenbag Challenge was held at the Mall of Asia in Pasay, Philippines on 8 November 2012. The activity promotes the use of reusable bags. The following groups of candidates emerged as winners:

Resorts Wear competition
The Resorts Wear Competition of the Miss Earth 2012 candidates were held on 9, 13 and 17 November 2012.

M.E. Eco-Ambassadress
The following contestants were chosen as Eco-Ambassadress:

M.E. Official Swimsuit Competition
The "Miss Earth 2012 Official Swimsuit Competition" were held on 10 and 14 November 2012. The winners are:

Order of announcements

Top 16

Top 8

Top 4

Controversies
Miss Earth Russia, Natalia Pereverzeva, has been heavily criticized for posing topless and for being the cover girl of the Russian Playboy's May 2011 issue (about six months before when she was crowned new Miss Earth Russia 2012). The 24 year old model and former finance specialist, then sporting a blonde hair, appeared to have her hands covering her private parts and did a double breast exposure. Pereverzeva kept mum about the topless photos when asked by media.

She stated, "I don’t think that’s a good question for Miss Earth. Real beauty should be not only natural beauty but the beauty should come from the inside". Her fellow candidates have mixed reactions regarding the issue.

However, the organizers of the Miss Earth contest came to the defense of the Russian beauty, saying Pereverzeva did not violate moral standards.

They also said Pereverzeva's Playboy pictorial was not as daring as the Playboy spread of another European contest who was not allowed to participate in the pageant.

"We cannot enforce our own cultural standards on candidates from other countries. Since Miss Earth is a global endeavor, Miss Russia was chosen through a legitimate official process in her country," Lorraine Schuck, Miss Earth executive vice president, said in a statement.

Barely after a week, Miss Russia made the international headlines once again by provoking an outrage in her motherland by calling it "a beggar" and "my poor long-suffering country, mercilessly torn to pieces by greedy, dishonest, unbelieving people". The source of the outrage came from a response to a standard question about what made her proud of her country and what she could promote about it, asked of all contestants of Miss Earth which has been stated in the pageant's official website.

Pereverzeva began by praising her country, saying it was, "a kind cow with very big eyes, funny horns and always chewing its mouth; oh, what sweet milk she gives!"

But, veering off message, she added: "My Russia is a beggar. My Russia cannot help her elderly and orphans. From it, bleeding, like from a sinking ship, engineers, doctors, teachers are fleeing, because they have nothing to live on. My Russia – it is an endless Caucasian war."

The stinging indictment, published in full on the pageant's website, caused a furore in Russia.

M.E. Sponsored Swimsuit Parade

The "Miss Earth 2012 Sponsored Swimsuit Parade" was held on 9 November 2012. The winners are:

Contestants

Notes

Debuts

Returns

Last competed in 2004:
 
Last competed in 2007:
 
Last competed in 2008:
 
Last competed in 2009:
 
Last competed in 2010:

Did not compete
  – Alexandra Kocsis
  – Miluska Huaroto
  – Carlisa Williams

Replacements
  – Tien-Jung Kuo was replaced by Jen-Ling Lu for undisclosed reason.
  – Alba Aquino could not compete due to a dispute and was dismissed; replaced by Rocío Castellanos.
  – Estefanía Realpe was replaced by Tatiana Torres after the original winner was dethroned.
  – Feh Rosseau Nyamndi was replaced by Sherina Vanderkoeelen for undisclosed reason.
  – Eliane khawand was replaced by Patricia Geagea for undisclosed reason.
  – Uyanga Ochirbat was replaced by Battsetseg Turbat for undisclosed reason.
  – Joanna Guianolini was replaced by Nathalia Moreira.

References

External links

 

2012
2012 beauty pageants
Beauty pageants in the Philippines
2012 in the Philippines